In mathematics, the Cameron–Martin theorem or Cameron–Martin formula (named after Robert Horton Cameron and W. T. Martin) is a theorem of measure theory that describes how abstract Wiener measure changes under translation by certain elements of the Cameron–Martin Hilbert space.

Motivation

The standard Gaussian measure  on -dimensional Euclidean space  is not translation-invariant.  (In fact, there is a unique translation invariant Radon measure up to scale by Haar's theorem: the -dimensional Lebesgue measure, denoted here .)  Instead, a measurable subset  has Gaussian measure

So under translation through , the Gaussian measure scales by the distribution function appearing in the last display:

The measure that associates to the set  the number  is the pushforward measure, denoted .  Here  refers to the translation map: .  The above calculation shows that the Radon–Nikodym derivative of the pushforward measure with respect to the original Gaussian measure is given by

The abstract Wiener measure  on a separable Banach space , where  is an abstract Wiener space, is also a "Gaussian measure" in a suitable sense. How does it change under translation? It turns out that a similar formula to the one above holds if we consider only translations by elements of the dense subspace .

Statement of the theorem

Let  be an abstract Wiener space with abstract Wiener measure .

where

denotes the Paley–Wiener integral.

If the Cameron–Martin formula did hold for arbitrary translations, it would contradict the following result:

(See quasi-invariant measure.)

In fact,  is quasi-invariant under translation by an element  if and only if .

Integration by parts

The Cameron–Martin formula gives rise to an integration by parts formula on : if   has bounded Fréchet derivative , integrating the Cameron–Martin formula with respect to Wiener measure on both sides gives

for any .

Comparison with the divergence theorem of vector calculus suggests

where  is the constant "vector field"  for all . The wish to consider more general vector fields and to think of stochastic integrals as "divergences" leads to the study of stochastic processes and the Malliavin calculus, and, in particular, the Clark–Ocone theorem and its associated integration by parts formula.

An application

Using Cameron–Martin theorem one may establish (See Liptser and Shiryayev 1977, p. 280) that for a  symmetric non-negative definite matrix  whose elements  are continuous and satisfy the condition

it holds for a −dimensional Wiener process  that

where  is a  nonpositive definite matrix which is a unique solution of the matrix-valued Riccati differential equation

See also

References

Probability theorems
Theorems in measure theory